Camp Canadensis is a seven-week, co-ed, overnight Jewish camp located in the Pocono Mountains region of Monroe County, Pennsylvania, US. Camp Canadensis is made up of campers primarily from New York, New Jersey, and Pennsylvania; however, there are campers coming from other nearby states.

At Canadensis, their goal is "to create an environment that is emotionally, physically and socially safe for campers and their parents in a first-rate facility".

Canadensis is an American Camp Association accredited camp.

History
Camp Canadensis was founded by William "Uncle Bill" Saltzman in 1941, and was named a Pioneer of Camping by the American Camp Association. He owned and operated the camp until his death in 1997; in his later years, his son Stevan co-operated the camp. After Bill's death, Stevan operated the camp until his death in 2000. Since then, Stevan's sister Terri Saltzman has owned and operated the camp.

Activities

Recent years

In 2000 Canadensis built a  art center; The Sylvia Saltzman Art Center is divided into six different rooms for a variety of art programs:
The Art Shack (general crafts, drawing, painting, jewelry-making, tie-dying, etc.); Woodworking; Ceramics; Photography (black & white, and digital); Glass Fusion; and Fashion Design.".

In 2008 Canadensis built an outdoor amphitheater. Aunt T's Amphitheater overlooks Lake Lenape and serves as the venue for the camp's morning lineup, as well as a variety of evening programming.

Other recent additions to Camp Canadensis include an indoor, all-weather, basketball court, and newly renovated horse stables.

The camp's new website was designed by Philadelphia graphic designer Andy O'Dore.

Out of camp trips
Canadensis Senior Campers embark on 4 different multiple day, out of camp trips to various locations. Traditionally, the trips visit the same destinations each year. Canadensis Lower Seniors spend 3 days and 2 nights in Lake Placid, New York each summer. Campers visit the Olympic Training Center, and take part in a variety of Olympic Attractions. Canadensis Upper Seniors spend 3 days and 2 nights sightseeing in Boston. Although the exact details change every year, common attractions include a Boston Duck Tour, lunch at Fire and Ice, Quincy Market, and a tour of Harvard University. Super Seniors spend 4 days in Niagara, and take part in traditional tourist attractions, such as Maid of the Mist. In 2010, the Niagara Falls trip also included a Cleveland, OH component, so campers could experience the Rock and Roll Hall of Fame. Canadensis CITs (Counselors-In-Training) spend 5 days at the Walt Disney World Resort in Orlando, Florida. In 2009 Canadensis introduced an optional College Tour Trip for their oldest campers, visiting Penn State, Franklin and Marshall, and Lehigh University. In 2010 the trip featured a series of New York schools.

Traditions
Color War has been a tradition at Camp Canadensis since its opening in 1941.  Color War is a series of five days in which the entire camp is divided into two teams, competing against one another in all athletic and artistic aspects of camp.  The two teams are led by CIT Captains, CIT Lieutenants, Counselor Captains, and CIT leaders. The role of CIT Captain, CIT Lieutenant, and Counselor Captain, are honors bestowed upon a staff member or Counselor-in-Training who has gone above and beyond their basic responsibilities throughout the summer, and demonstrates superior leadership qualities.

Color War used to be a single competition, until 1966 when it was split into a separate Athletic Competition and Sing Competition. According to the plaques hanging in the main office, Color War was scored as a single event with a single winner until 1965. During the years of 1966-2006 Color War had separate winners for the Athletic Competition and Sing Competition. Starting in 2007, Color War was once again scored as a single event with a single winner.

Other traditions include hotdogs and fireworks for Independence Day, and a trip for all campers and staff members to Dorney Park & Wildwater Kingdom at the end of the summer.

Recreation unlimited
Before and after the 7 Week Camp Program, Camp Canadensis rents its facility to a variety of outside groups. Recent groups include The Philadelphia Folksong Society, Girl Scouts of the USA, and Running Works, Community Middle School's Outdoor Education program, and Radnor Township School District, as well as multiple Marching Bands from bordering states.

References

External links
 

Canadensis
Buildings and structures in Monroe County, Pennsylvania